Shaun or Sean George may refer to:

 Shaun George (boxer) (born 1979), American boxer
 Shaun George (cricketer) (born 1968), South African umpire and former cricketer
Diabolic (rapper), né Sean George